Tuba Çandar (born 1948) is a Turkish journalist and author of biographies of three leading Turkish intellectuals. Her 700-page biography of the murdered Armenian journalist Hrant Dink's life "Hrant" (2010) is a best-seller in Turkey for which she interviewed 125 people.

Early life
Born in 1948, Tuba Çandar attended the Austrian High School in Istanbul. She received an AFS Intercultural Programs scholarship and completed her studies in the USA. Çandar received her  bachelor's degree in political science and international relations at the Ankara University in 1979.

Publishing career
Çandar went to exile in Germany after the military coup of March 1971, and following the amnesty, she returned to Turkey where she became the editor-in-chief of Bizim Almanca magazine under the Turkish daily Cumhuriyet. She worked as an editor at Gergedan magazine and freelanced for various dailies including Yeni Yüzyıl, penning pieces on culture, arts and travel, and Gazete Pazar, where she started her "Portraits" column.

Her first book about the life of one of Turkey's first female architects Mualla Eyüboğlu Anhegger, "Hitit Güneşi" (Hitite Sun) was published in 2003. She released Murat Belge Bir Hayat (Turkish: Murat Belge. A Life) on the outspoken leftist Turkish intellectual and literary critic Murat Belge in 2007. Her book Hrant came out on the birthday of Hrant Dink on 15 September in 2010.

Personal life
Çandar is married to journalist and columnist Cengiz Çandar, and they have one daughter.

Bibliography
The English translations of these titles are not the official titles.

 Hitit Güneşi (Hitite Sun)
 Murat Belge / Bir Hayat...
 Hrant'', available in 2016 in English

References

1948 births
Living people
Journalists from Istanbul
Ankara University Faculty of Political Sciences alumni
Turkish biographers
Cumhuriyet people
Yeni Yüzyıl people
20th-century Turkish women writers
20th-century Turkish writers